The Christopher Hewitt Award is an annual literary award given each June by A&U magazine for writing that addresses or relates to HIV/AIDS. One award is given in each of four categories: fiction, poetry, creative nonfiction, and drama. Awards were first given in 2013. The winners for 2013 were Lisa Sandlin (fiction), Dorothy Alexander (poetry), Terry Dugan (creative nonfiction), and Evan Guilford-Blake (drama).

A&U (originally, Art & Understanding) was established in 1991 as a response to the ongoing loss of members of the creative community due to HIV/AIDS and as a forum for documenting their work. Today, the nonprofit magazine focuses on a variety of aspects of the global pandemic—including advocacy, prevention, and care—in addition to literature and the arts. Notable artists, activists, and writers are interviewed and featured in each issue. Examples include Anjelica Huston, Janet Jackson, Tony Kushner, George Takei, and Lupe Ontiveros.

The award was initiated by Brent Calderwood, A&U's literary editor from 2011 to 2015, along with Chael Needle, A&U's editor. It was named for Christopher Hewitt, who served as A&Us first literary editor. Born in Worcestershire, England, Hewitt immigrated to the United States in 1974. His poems and translations appeared in The New Yorker, American Poetry Review, The Advocate, The James White Review, BENT, and in the anthology Queer Crips: Disabled Gay Men Tell Their Stories. At the time of his death in 2004 at the age of fifty-eight, he was working on a memoir titled “Brittle Bones,” in part about living with osteogenesis imperfecta.Christoper Hewitt Award Winners 2020Nonfiction:
“The Handsomest Man in New York” by Patrick Mulcahey 

Drama:
“The Toe Incident” by Katherine Gleason

Poetry:
“It Was Never Supposed to Be Ours” by Ben Kline

Fiction:
“Soul Cowboy” by Cris Eli Blak Christoper Hewitt Award Winners 2019Nonfiction:
“How Online Dating Empowers Women with HIV” by Claire Gasamagera

Drama:
“My Darling Love” by Joe Gulla

Poetry:
“Elegy for Ken Meeks” by Travis Chi Wing Lau

Fiction:
No winning entryChristoper Hewitt Award Winners 2018Nonfiction:
“The Custody Visit (1987)” by Andrea Laiacona Dooley

Drama:
“Nancy F@&*ing Reagan” by Daniel Hurewitz

Poetry:
“San Francisco General” by Greg Casale

Fiction:
“The Pond” by John Whittier TreatChristoper Hewitt Award Winners 2017Nonfiction:
“We Blessed” by John Boucher

Drama:
“The War Years” by Charles Stephens

Poetry:
No winning entry

Fiction:
“The Love Whisperer” by Raymond LuczakChristoper Hewitt Award Winners 2016Nonfiction:
“Save Tonight” by Jennifer Sembler

Drama:
No winning entry

Poetry:
“Days of 1993, ’94, and ’95” by Benjamin S. Grossberg

Fiction:
“Albert’s Prayer” by Marie EspositoChristoper Hewitt Award Winners 2015Nonfiction:
“Long-Term Survivor” by Victoria Noe

Drama:
No winning entry

Poetry:
“At the LGBT History Museum in San Francisco…” by Sean Patrick Mulroy (tied with)
“New New Colossus” by Noah Stetzer

Fiction:
“Drowned River” by Dale CorvinoChristoper Hewitt Award Winners 2014Nonfiction:
“Voicing That Inner Scream: Visibility and AIDS in LGBT Africa” by Nick Hadikwa Mwaluko

Drama:
No winning entry

Poetry:
“Building Immunities” by Stephen Mead

Fiction:
“After the Cure” by Stephen S. MillsChristopher Hewitt Award Winners 2013'

Nonfiction:
“Like Taking Blood from a Baby” by Terry Dugan

Drama:
“Cowboy Nocturne” by Evan Guilford-Blake 

Poetry:
“Trip to Wyuka” by Dorothy Alexander 

Fiction:
“Greyhound, 1984” by Lisa Sandlin

References

HIV/AIDS in literature
Literary awards by magazines and newspapers
Writing contests
Dramatist and playwright awards
American non-fiction literary awards
American fiction awards
American poetry awards
Essay awards